Walery Jaworski (born March 20, 1849 in Florynka – died July 17, 1924 in Kraków) was one of the pioneers of gastroenterology in Poland.

In 1899 he described bacteria living in the human stomach that he named Vibrio rugula. He speculated that they were responsible for stomach ulcers, gastric cancer and achylia. It was one of the first observations of Helicobacter pylori. He published those findings in 1899 in a book titled Podręcznik chorób żołądka (Handbook of Gastric Diseases) but it was available only in Polish and went unnoticed. 

His findings were independently confirmed by Robin Warren and Barry Marshall, who received the Nobel Prize in 2005.

References

1849 births
1924 deaths
Polish gastroenterologists